Gaylor L. Kasle (born 1941) is a professional American bridge player from Boca Raton, Florida.

Bridge accomplishments

Wins

 North American Bridge Championships (10)
 Leventritt Silver Ribbon Pairs (1) 2006 
 Wernher Open Pairs (1) 1993 
 Jacoby Open Swiss Teams (1) 2012 
 Vanderbilt (1) 1994 
 Senior Knockout Teams (1) 2012 
 Keohane North American Swiss Teams (3) 1982, 1985, 1990 
 Mitchell Board-a-Match Teams (1) 1973 
 Chicago Mixed Board-a-Match (1) 1996

Runners-up

 North American Bridge Championships
 Leventritt Silver Ribbon Pairs (2) 2008, 2009 
 Blue Ribbon Pairs (1) 1989 
 Nail Life Master Open Pairs (1) 1966 
 Grand National Teams (1) 1989 
 Keohane North American Swiss Teams (2) 1986, 2002 
 Chicago Mixed Board-a-Match (1) 2008 
 Reisinger (1) 1978

Notes

External links
 

1941 births
Living people
American contract bridge players
People from Boca Raton, Florida
Place of birth missing (living people)
Date of birth missing (living people)